Ian Charles Community Hospital is a health facility in Castle Road East, Grantown-on-Spey, Scotland. It is managed by NHS Highland.

History
The facility, which was founded by the Countess of Seafield in memory of her son, Ian Charles Ogilvy-Grant, opened in 1885. A maternity wing was completed in 1923, and, after joining the National Health Service in 1948, it was further expanded in the 1950s. In February 2015, it was announced that the hospital would close once a new health centre in Aviemore had been completed.

References

NHS Scotland hospitals
1885 establishments in Scotland
Hospitals established in 1885
Hospitals in Highland (council area)
Hospital buildings completed in 1885